Świtalski (feminine: Świtalska) is a Polish family name. Notable people with the surname include:

 Jon Switalski,  American politician
 Karol Świtalski (1902–1993), Polish Lutheran priest
 Kazimierz Świtalski (1886–1962), Polish politician
 Mariusz Świtalski (born 1962), Polish entrepreneur
 Michael Switalski (born 1955), American politician
 Piotr Świtalski (born 1957), Polish diplomat

See also
 

Polish-language surnames